Friedrich Siebenmann is the name of:

 Friedrich Siebenmann (otolaryngologist) (1852–1928), Swiss otolaryngologist
 Friedrich Siebenmann (trade unionist) (1851-1901), Swiss trade unionist